Perspectives U.S.A. was a magazine of art and culture of the United States, that was published in New York City from 1952 to 1956, as part of the so-called "Cultural Cold War against the Soviet Union."

History and profile
The first issue appeared in October 1952. It was edited by James Laughlin and published by the non-profit organization Intercultural Publications, with funds from the Ford Foundation. It had several editions in different languages, including English, French, German, and Italian. The magazine, published on a quarterly basis, ceased publication after the foundation concluded that it had little impact in Europe. The final issue was the sixteenth one, which appeared in July 1956.

References

External links
 WorldCat record

Visual arts magazines published in the United States
Quarterly magazines published in the United States
Cultural magazines published in the United States
Defunct magazines published in the United States
Magazines established in 1952
Magazines disestablished in 1956
Magazines published in New York City
Multilingual magazines